DC Nation was a programming block of DC Comics series and shorts that aired on American television channel Cartoon Network on Saturday morning. It premiered on March 3, 2012, and was produced by Warner Bros. Animation. Some of the shows in DC Nation include Green Lantern: The Animated Series and Young Justice (with Beware the Batman in 2013). On June 8, 2012, Cartoon Network announced that it would revive the Teen Titans animated series as Teen Titans Go!, based on the New Teen Titans shorts, in 2013; episodes began airing in April of that year.

Shows
Previous series include Young Justice and Green Lantern: The Animated Series. The final lineup includes Teen Titans Go! and Beware the Batman, along with DC Nation Shorts.

Theme songs
Skrillex – "Rock N Roll"
 Richardson & Macklin & Tom Ford – "Acid Cube"

Shorts

Many short films produced by Sam Register air on the show; they are mainly comedy. In the first season, these included New Teen Titans, S.B.F.F. and DC's World's Funnest from Aardman Studios. Season two saw two additional short series: JL Animals and Amethyst: Princess of Gemworld.

Controversy
On October 13, 2012, two weeks after it had returned from a summer break and ten hours before it was supposed to air, the block was ceased from the schedule by Cartoon Network; an hour of DreamWorks Dragons was shown on Saturdays with Johnny Test on Sundays. DC Nation workers were told about the action by fans. Later that day, Cartoon Network and DC Nation's Facebook and Twitter profiles stated that the block had been put on hiatus and will resume airing in January 2013.

An online petition was started that day to bring back the block by the end of the year and reached its first goal of 10,000 signatures on October 15. The Green Lantern episode "Steam Lantern" and the Young Justice episode "Before the Dawn", episodes that had been scheduled to air, were released to the iTunes Store and became the top two television programs of that day,. They also became available on Amazon.com on October 16. No official explanation has been given for the extended hiatus. As of October 13, all DC Nation consisted of is Teen Titans Go! repeats and various shorts, as well as being pre-empted at least four times in 2014 for special programming (such as the HD remaster of Pokémon: The First Movie).  Young Justice, Green Lantern and Beware the Batman were all canceled with little or no information given to the fans other than a rumored report that the DC parent company did not feel these shows' lack of humor appealed to kids anymore.

By 2015, the block's discontinuation was apparent with the shorts airing exclusively during Teen Titans Go! premiere episodes on Wednesday nights, until they were not.

References

External links
 

 
Cartoon Network programming blocks
Television programming blocks